Theodore Runyon (October 29, 1822 – January 27, 1896) was a United States politician, diplomat, and American Civil War brigadier general in the New Jersey Militia, serving with the Union Army at the Battle of First Bull Run. Runyon was a lawyer before the Civil War and mayor of Newark, New Jersey, a major general in command of the New Jersey National Guard until 1873, first president of the Manufacturers' National Bank of Newark, chancellor of New Jersey for 14 years and, between 1893 and 1896, envoy and later ambassador to Germany.

Early life
Theodore Runyon was born in Somerville, New Jersey of Huguenot descent. He was a direct descendant of Vincent Rongion (1644–1713), a Huguenot who was born in Poitiers, France and settled in New Jersey. Theodore Runyon graduated from Yale University, where he helped found Scroll and Key Society. Runyon was admitted to the New Jersey bar in 1846 and began the practice of law in Newark, New Jersey.

Military service
As a brigadier general in the New Jersey militia, Runyon commanded the Fourth Division of the Army of Northeastern Virginia in June and July 1861. The division was composed of 90-day New Jersey volunteer regiments and new 3-year New Jersey volunteer regiments which had been organized for less than a month. Union Army commander, Major General Irvin McDowell held this division in reserve during the First Battle of Bull Run and they were not engaged in the battle.

Although the Historians John and David Eicher show Runyon in charge of the division and as mustered out of the volunteers on July 31, 1861, they do not show him with a formal Union Army commission. Also, neither the 1906 War Department list of Union Army generals nor Historian Ezra J. Warner's Generals in Blue show Runyon as a commissioned Union Army general rather than or in addition to a New Jersey militia general. Runyon held his position as division commander as a State militia or short-term volunteer general, not as a formally commissioned Union Army general. On February 25, 1862, Runyon was appointed a brevet major general in the New Jersey militia.  After the war, he was elected a companion of the Pennsylvania Commandery of the Military Order of the Loyal Legion of the United States - a military society of officers of the Union armed forces and their descendants.

Fort Runyon, named in Theodore Runyon's honor, was a timber and earthwork fort constructed by the Union Army following the occupation of northern Virginia in order to defend the southern approaches to the Long Bridge as part of the defenses of Washington, D.C. during that war.

Later career
From 1864 to 1866, Runyon served as mayor of Newark as a Democrat. He had previously been city attorney and city counsel. Runyon was appointed major general in charge of the New Jersey National Guard, and served in this post until 1873. He was the first president of the Manufacturers' National Bank of Newark until he became chancellor of New Jersey, an office he held for 14 years.

In 1893, Runyon became envoy and later ambassador to Germany, where he died in 1896. He is buried at Mount Pleasant Cemetery in Newark, New Jersey.

Notes

References
 Davis, William C. Battle at Bull Run: A History of the First Major Campaign of the Civil War. Baton Rouge: Louisiana State University Press, 1977. .
 Detzer, David. Donnybrook: The Battle of Bull Run, 1861. New York: Harcourt, 2004. .
 Eicher, John H., and David J. Eicher, Civil War High Commands. Stanford: Stanford University Press, 2001. .
 United States War Department, The Military Secretary's Office, Memorandum Relative to the General Officers in the Armies of the United States During the Civil War, 1861-1865 (Compiled from Official Records.) 1906. Retrieved August 5, 2010.
 Warner, Ezra J. Generals in Blue: Lives of the Union Commanders. Baton Rouge: Louisiana State University Press, 1964. .

External links

All Biographies: Brigadier-General Theodore Runyon, U.S.V.
The Political Graveyard: Index to Politicians: Rugh to Rusch

 	 
 

 

Union militia generals
People of New Jersey in the American Civil War
Mayors of Newark, New Jersey
New Jersey Democrats
Ambassadors of the United States to Germany
Burials at Mount Pleasant Cemetery (Newark, New Jersey)
Yale University alumni
1822 births
1896 deaths
Politicians from Somerville, New Jersey
American people of French descent
19th-century American diplomats
19th-century American politicians